The Qujing International Challenger was a professional tennis tournament played on hard courts. It was part of the ATP Challenger Tour. It was held in Qujing, China in 2018.

Past finals

Singles

Doubles

ATP Challenger Tour
Hard court tennis tournaments
Tennis tournaments in China
Qujing